Tarnaszentmária is a village at the foot of the Mátra Mountains in Heves County, Hungary.

Sightseeing

In Tarnaszentmária, one of the oldest Hungarian churches can be found. It was founded by the Genus Aba, who were related to the Árpád house kings. Samuel Aba of Hungary was the husband of the sister of Stephen I of Hungary. The old church has a central nave and eastern apsis, however, the eastern apsis has two floors. In the lower floor a tomb was found in the 19th century.

References

Bibliography
 Csemegi J.: A tarnaszentmáriai templom hajójának stíluskritikai vizsgálata (The stylecritical study of the Tarnaszentmária Church), Antiquitas Hungarica III, 1949, p. 92-107.
 Kozák K. - M. Anda J.: Tarnaszentmária. Római katolikus templom (Tájak-Korok-Múzeumok Kiskönyvtára 321), Budapest, 1988, TKM Egyesület  
 Mencl, Václav: Két ősi építészeti emlék Magyarországon. (Two old archaeo architectural heritage in Hungary), Művészettörténeti Értesítő VIII, 1959, page 217-220. 
 Sápi, Lajos: A tarnaszentmáriai templom. (The Tarnaszentmária Church), Műemlékvédelem, XXIV, 1980, page 107-117.
 Gerevich T.: Magyarország románkori emlékei (Die romanischen Denkmäler Ungarns), Egyetemi nyomda, Budapest, 1939
 Szőnyi O. (É.n.): Régi magyar templomok. Alte Ungarische Kirchen. Anciennes églises Hongroises. Hungarian Churches of Yore. A Műemlékek Országos Bizottsága. Mirályi Magyar Egyetemi Nyomda, Budapest
 Henszlmann, I.: Magyarország ó-keresztyén, román és átmeneti stylü mű-emlékeinek rövid ismertetése, (Old-Christian, Romanesque and Transitional Style Architecture in Hungary). Királyi Magyar Egyetemi Nyomda, Budapest, 1876
 Genthon I.: Magyarország műemlékei. (Architectural Heritage of Hungary). Budapest, 1959

Romanesque architecture in Hungary
Populated places in Heves County